Mühlen railway station may refer to 
Mühlen (Oldb) railway station
Mühlen (bei Horb) railway station